Laz (also known as Lāzeh) is a village in Lavan Rural District, Kish District, Bandar Lengeh County, Hormozgan Province, Iran. At the 2006 census, its population was 890, in 171 families.  The village lies on Lavan Island in the Persian Gulf.

Language 
The linguistic composition of the village:

References 

Populated places in Bandar Lengeh County